Jenny Downham (born 1964) is a British novelist and an ex-actress who has published four books.

Career

Her debut novel, Before I Die, is the fictional account of the last few months of a sixteen-year-old girl who has been dying of leukaemia for four years. The book won the 2008 Branford Boase Award. It was short listed for the 2008 Guardian Children's Fiction Prize and the 2008 Lancashire Children's Book of the Year and nominated for the 2008 Carnegie Medal and the 2008 Booktrust Teenage Prize. In 2012 it was adapted into a film called Now Is Good and starred Dakota Fanning.

Downham's second novel, You Against Me, was published in December 2010. The book is a novel about family, loyalty, and the choices which we have to make.

Her third novel, Unbecoming, published in 2015, is a story of three generations of women and the uncovering of family secrets. 

Her fourth, Furious Thing, published in October 2019, was shortlisted in the children's book category of that year's Costa Book Awards.

References

External links

 Official Website
  Works by or about Jenny Downham in libraries (Worldcat catalogue)
 Guardian Review
 New York Times Review
 The Times Feature
 Meet the Author Video
 

1964 births
Living people
British women novelists
21st-century British novelists
British writers of young adult literature
21st-century British women writers
Women writers of young adult literature